
Gmina Starcza is a rural gmina (administrative district) in Częstochowa County, Silesian Voivodeship, in southern Poland.

The gmina contains part of the protected area called Upper Liswarta Forests Landscape Park.

Villages
Gmina Starcza contains the villages and settlements of Klepaczka, Łazy, Łysiec, Rudnik Mały, Starcza, Własna and Zielone Górki.

Neighbouring gminas
Gmina Starcza is bordered by the gminas of Kamienica Polska, Konopiska, Poczesna and Woźniki.

References

Starcza
Częstochowa County